Sharon Feingold is an American voice actress. She is the brand voice for HGTV and Food Network Asia and can be heard in promos for shows such as Fixer Upper, Property Brothers, and House Hunters. She is the voice of the ATL Skytrain and The Plane Train Hartsfield-Jackson Atlanta International Airport, as well as the narration voice of the Incline Railway at Chattanooga, Tennessee's Lookout Mountain. In May 2010, she appeared as herself on Donald Trump's Celebrity Apprentice as a hired voiceover talent for team Tenacity, appearing alongside Cyndi Lauper, Holly Robinson-Peete and Curtis Stone. She is the voice behind many of Nickelodeon and Nick Jr.'s quizzes and recap videos on their digital channels and YouTube. She provides the narration for four streaming on-demand biographies of Jennifer Aniston, Adam Sandler, Joe Biden and Kamala Harris

According to her IMDB profile, she voiced the teenage character, Megan, in the animated TV series Mew Mew Power (2003).

She is also a writer/filmmaker of two award-winning short comedies, The Script Re-Right and Emojional Breakdown.

References 

American voice actresses
Living people
Year of birth missing (living people)
Place of birth missing (living people)
21st-century American women